The Golden Horse Award for Best Art Direction is an award presented annually at the Golden Horse Awards by the Taipei Golden Horse Film Festival Executive Committee. The latest ceremony was held in 2022, with Mak Kwok-keung and Renee Wong winning the award for the film Limbo.

References

Golden Horse Film Awards